The Godavari Urban Development Authority (GUDA) is an urban planning agency spread over the district of East Godavari in the Indian state of Andhra Pradesh. It was constituted on 4 November 2016, under Andhra Pradesh Metropolitan Region and Urban Development Authority Act, 2016 with the headquarters located at Kakinada.

Jurisdiction 
The urban local bodies in the jurisdiction covers, two municipal corporations of Rajahmundry and Kakinada;  municipalities viz., Samalkot, Peddapuram Pithapuram, Gollaprolu, Ramachandrapuram, Mandapeta, Yeleswaram, Amalapuram, Mummidivaram, Tuni  .

Recent notification by Govt. (28/01/2020) which increase the purview of GUDA.

ULBs:

1 Amalapuram

2 Mandapeta

3 Mummidivaram

4 Yeleswaram

No. of Villages and Areas (km2) Covered Recently in Different Mandals.

1 Kadiam 3 villages 20.12

2 Mandapeta 6 villages 44.51

3 Anaparti 6 villages 29.99

4 Biccavolu 6 villages 31.88

5 Pedapudi 10 villages 45.17

6 Yeleswaram (Part) 5 villages 32.60

7 Alamuru 15 villages 78.32

8 Kapileswararapuram 15 villages 104.25

9 Rayavaram 10 villages 79.83

10 Pamarru 24 villages 98.62

11 Kajuluru 20 villages 116.36

12 Amalapuram 16 villages 75.14

13 Kakinada Rural (Part) 2 villages (Part) 5.18

14 Thondangi (Part) 1 village (Part) 8.87

15 Mummidivaram 10 villages 70.69

16 Uppalaguptam (Part) 3 villages 19.08

17 Gokavaram 15 villages 166.34

18 Razole (Part) 9 villages 54.07
 
19 I.Polavaram 11 villages 128.19

20 Tuni 11 villages 65.20

21 Allavaram (Part) 3 villages 21.35

22 Mamidikuduru (Part) 14 villages 58.25

23 Seethanagaram 12 villages 138.87
 
24 Korukonda 9 villages 91.78

References 

East Godavari district
Urban development authorities of Andhra Pradesh
State urban development authorities of India